Eupithecia costivallata is a moth in the  family Geometridae. It is found in Peru.

References

Moths described in 1904
costivallata
Moths of South America
Taxa named by William Warren (entomologist)